Jennifer Mabus (born November 6, 1989) is an American YouTuber and hiker. She spent 173 days thru-hiking the Pacific Crest Trail solo in 2018, filming every day of the journey, and posting vlogs to her YouTube channel covering every day of the journey as she hiked. She competed collegiately in cheerleading for the Nevada Wolf Pack.

Background
Mabus was born November 6, 1989, in Reno, Nevada, United States. As a child she was a gymnast and dreamed of competing at the Olympic Games. Due to multiple injuries she took an alternate pathway, instead graduating in 2012 with her bachelor's degree in mechanical engineering from the University of Nevada, Reno where she was a student athlete, competing as part of the Nevada Wolf Pack as a cheerleader.

Career

2017–2018
In 2017, Mabus started blogging and publishing videos on her YouTube channel. On October 15, 2017, she filmed a thru-hike with her friend Emma at The Enchantments, publishing her first vlog of a thru-hike on YouTube three days later, October 18, of their hike.

2018 Pacific Crest Trail northbound thru-hike
For 173 days in 2018 she thru-hiked the Pacific Crest Trail, PCT, from south (United States-side of the United States–Mexico border) to north (Canada), making the 2,653-mile journey on foot on her own (solo) and vlogging the journey as she hiked. She started hiking the trail with her father on Saturday April 14, 2018, and finished the trail solo on Wednesday October 3, 2018. The trail name she earned during the journey was "Starburst" in allusion to her brightly colored backpack. Video footage of the hike she published on YouTube as she hiked included every day of her 173 day journey, she edited her own videos, and posted the vlogs as she hiked with a few of the videos delayed in posting due to trail conditions, such as a lack of internet/cell phone connectivity, as well as running out of storage space on her filming device. She was one of 1,186 hikers to make history in 2018 by setting an all-time record for the most number of hikers to cross the finish line in a given year of the trail's over 65 years of existence, which is a record that remains unbroken as of mid-April 2022. The total thru-hike cost her $8,446.81, which included supplies, food and lodging, and miscellaneous expenses such as excursions to the spa and to see a SpaceX rocket launch.

From the duration of the thru-hike, Mabus published 130 videos on YouTube that she filmed while hiking on-trail between day one and day 173, inclusive.

2019–2021
October 2019 she married U.S. Navy diver Owen Frederick and in October 2021 they had a son, Finley "Finn" Mabus Frederick, together. Following their marriage, Mabus coped with his deployment through the COVID-19 pandemic by continuing her joined thru-hiking and YouTube pursuits, vlogging her thru-hike of the 171-mile Tahoe Rim Trail in August 2020, which she accomplished hiking with fellow thru-hiker and YouTuber Dyana Carmella for the entirety of the trail. On August 14, 2020, she competed the trail and was inducted into the "165 mile club" of hikers who had completed the thru-hike by the Tahoe Rim Trail Association.

2020 Tahoe Rim Trail thru-hike YouTube documentation
The following videos Mabus published on YouTube documenting her 2020 Tahoe Rim Trail thru-hike.

 Miles hiked not in video documentation.

YouTube documented thru-hikes

Influence

Making the unknown visible
One of the full-time hikers Mabus has influenced is Lily Tagariello, who in part derived her motivation and confidence for successfully thru-hiking the Pacific Crest Trail in 2021 from watching Mabus's vlogs, which made a trail she had not been to before tangible virtually from afar, stating to Kinute of the impact, Lily Tagariello said, "Thru-hiking became the only thing I cared about, even before I ever stepped foot on the PCT."

References

External links
 

1989 births
Living people
People from Reno, Nevada
University of Nevada, Reno alumni
Nevada Wolf Pack athletes
American YouTubers
Hikers